"Enchanted" is a song written and recorded by American singer-songwriter Taylor Swift for her third studio album, Speak Now (2010). Produced by Swift and Nathan Chapman, the song is about infatuation with someone after meeting them for the first time, and worrying about whether the initial feeling will be reciprocated. It is a power ballad with acoustic guitar crescendos after each refrain, leading to a harmony-layered coda.

Upon Speak Now release in 2010, "Enchanted" charted on the Canadian Hot 100 (number 95) and the US Billboard Hot 100 (number 75). It was certified gold by the Recording Industry Association of America (RIAA). Swift included the song on the set lists of three of her world tours, the Speak Now World Tour (2011–2012) , the 1989 World Tour (2015) and The Eras Tour (2023).

After going viral on the TikTok video sharing app in October–November 2021, "Enchanted" reached a new peak on the Canadian Hot 100 (47). It also charted in Australia (50) and Singapore (14), and was certified gold by the Australian Recording Industry Association (ARIA) in December 2021.

Background and release 
Taylor Swift released her third studio album, Speak Now, on October 25, 2010. She wrote all 14 album tracks by herself. Swift wrote "Enchanted" about a man whom she was infatuated with after meeting him in person in New York City, and how she hoped to continue the relationship. She deliberately used the word "wonderstruck" in the lyrics because the subject used it in one of his emails to Swift after they met. In the album booklet, Swift includes the hidden message for the song as "A-D-A-M". "Enchanted" was originally the title track for Speak Now, but Swift changed the album title after consulting with Big Machine Records president Scott Borchetta, who deemed Enchanted unfit for the album's grown-up perspectives.

Upon the album's release, the media speculated that the subject of the song was singer-songwriter Adam Young, the founder of music project Owl City. Young responded on Owl City's website on February 13, 2011, that he too was infatuated by Swift after they met for the first time. He uploaded his cover of "Enchanted", in which he changed some of the lyrics to directly address Swift. He sings, "I was never in love with someone else / I never had somebody waiting on me / 'Cause you were all of my dreams come true / And I just wish you knew / Taylor I was so in love with you;" responding to the original's lyrics, "Please don't be in love with someone else / Please don't have somebody waiting on you." Despite the media's speculation, Swift never confirmed or denied that Young was the song's subject, and she never responded to Young's cover.

In October 2011, Swift partnered with Elizabeth Arden, Inc. to release her fragrance brand "Wonderstruck", whose name references the lyrics of "Enchanted". After the success of "Wonderstruck", she released a second fragrance brand called "Wonderstruck Enchanted" in July 2012; both perfumes stem from the fairy tale-inspired theme of "Enchanted" about being enamored by someone after meeting for the first time.

Music and lyrics 

Musically, "Enchanted" is a power ballad. The song begins with gentle acoustic guitar, which crescendos after each lyric "I was enchanted to meet you". Towards the song's conclusion is a harmony-layered coda featuring multitracked Swift's vocals over synthesizers. BBC Music critic Matthew Horton described it as a pop song. According to Rob Sheffield of Rolling Stone, "Enchanted" includes rock influences. The Daily Telegraph described it as an old-school country song, but Brittany McKenna from Billboard considered the track "outside of the boundaries of country music". Cathalena E. Burch from the Arizona Daily Star deemed it an "arena-rock-worthy ballad".

"Enchanted" describes the aftermath of an encounter with a special person without knowing whether the infatuation would be reciprocated. The lyrics feature a fairy tale undertone to describe romance. The song opens with a scene where Swift first encounters her love interest, "Your eyes whispered 'have we met?'/ Across the room your silhouette starts to make its way to me," over repeated guitar chords. As the song progresses, she wonders about the possibility of a new romance over electric guitar riffs and a steady drum beat. Swift said the bridge was her favorite part because it represents her stream of consciousness when she was writing the song: "Please don't be in love with someone else / Please don't have somebody waiting on you." She said, "it feels good to write exactly what your thoughts were in a certain moment."

Live performances 

Swift's first live performance of "Enchanted" was for an NBC Speak Now Thanksgiving Special, which broadcast on November 25, 2010. The TV special showcased the making of the album along with live performances on a rooftop in New York City. Swift included "Enchanted" on the set list for her Speak Now World Tour (2011–2012). During the concerts, she performed in a night gown atop a winding staircase, with ballerinas dancing in the backdrop. For her shows on the 1989 World Tour, she included a stripped-down mashup of "Enchanted" and "Wildest Dreams" performing on a grand piano. It was the only song from Speak Now performed on the Eras Tour (2023). During the performance she was dressed in a voluminous ballgown and surrounded by dancers dressed in sparkling, flowing dresses.

Swift included "Enchanted" on select dates of her other tours. During the Red Tour (2012–2013), she performed "Enchanted" at shows in Denver and Portland. She also performed it as a surprise song at the Reputation Stadium Tour show at MetLife Stadium on July 22, 2018.

Critical reception 
"Enchanted" was acclaimed by critics. In a Rolling Stone review of Speak Now, Sheffield commented that Swift's "voice is unaffected enough to mask how masterful she has become as a singer". He included "Enchanted" among the best songs released by Swift, highlighting the harmony-layered coda as a "coup de grace". Alex Macpherson from The Guardian praised the song for showcasing "Swift's instinct for capturing emotion with astonishing exactitude – right down to the dread sneaking in at the song's close". Matthew Horton of BBC Music praised its radio-friendly production, and Slant Magazine critic Jonathan Keefe lauded the production for exhibiting Swift's songwriting craftsmanship, selecting "Enchanted" as one of the album's highlights.

Erin Strecker of Billboard ranked it as the fourth most underrated Taylor Swift song in a 2014 list. The Daily Telegraph included it in their 2014 list of Swift's top ten songs. In another ranking of Swift's discography, Jane Song from Paste placed "Enchanted" among the top ten best songs released by Swift, lauding the track for Swift's songwriting resulting in a captivating narrative. Hannah Mylrea of NME specifically highlighted the track's "huge swooning instrumentals and [...] heartfelt chorus". Nate Jones from Vulture praised the production, but commented that the song "didn't need to be six minutes long".

Commercial performance 
After Speak Now was released, on November 13, 2010, "Enchanted" entered the US Billboard Hot 100 at number 75, the Digital Song Sales chart at number 44, and the Country Digital Song Sales chart at number 11. It entered at number 95 on the Canadian Hot 100 chart. In 2014, the Recording Industry Association of America (RIAA) certified "Enchanted" gold for surpassing 500,000 track-equivalent units, based on sales and on-demand streaming.

Between October and November 2021, "Enchanted" experienced a popularity resurgence after it went viral on the video sharing app TikTok. In the United States, for the week of October 27, 2021, it amassed over one million streams; the following week, it gained over three million streams. The song's unexpected popularity was part of "SwiftTok", a hashtag for the collection of TikTok videos using Swift's songs. "Enchanted" peaked at number 55 on the Billboard Global 200. It reached a new peak on the Canadian Hot 100, at number 47. The song charted on the singles charts of Australia (number 50) and Singapore (number 14). In December 2021, the Australian Recording Industry Association (ARIA) certified the song gold. It reached the top ten on Billboard Country Streaming Songs, and entered two other Billboard component charts: Digital Song Sales and Streaming Songs.

Credits and personnel 
Credits adapted from Tidal

 Taylor Swift – vocals, songwriter, producer, acoustic guitar
 Nathan Chapman – producer, acoustic guitar, banjo, bass guitar, digital piano, electric guitar, mandolin, organ, piano, synthesizer
 Chris Carmichael – string arranger, strings
 Tim Lauer – hammond B3, piano
 Bryan Sutton – acoustic guitar
 Amos Heller – bass guitar
 Tim Marks – bass guitar
 Tommy Sims – bass guitar
 John Gardner – drums
 Nick Buda – drums
 Shannon Forrest – drums
 Grant Mickelson – electric guitar
 Mike Meadows – electric guitar
 Paul Sidoti – electric guitar
 Rob Hajacos – fiddle
 Al Wilson – percussion
 Eric Darken – percussion
 Smith Curry – steel guitar

Charts

Certifications

References 

Taylor Swift songs
Songs written by Taylor Swift
2010 songs
2010s ballads
Country ballads
Song recordings produced by Taylor Swift
Song recordings produced by Nathan Chapman (record producer)
Pop ballads